Gezak (also known as Gazak-e Beyẕā’, Gezak-e Beyzā’, Kazak, Khasak, and Khāzak) is a village in Banesh Rural District, Beyza District, Sepidan County, Fars Province, Iran. At the 2006 census, its population was 136, in 31 families.

References 

Populated places in Beyza County